The 2000–01 Turkish Ice Hockey Super League season was the ninth season of the Turkish Ice Hockey Super League, the top level of ice hockey in Turkey. 10 teams participated in the league.

Regular season

Playoffs

Semifinals 
 Büyükşehir Belediyesi Ankara Spor Kulübü - Bogazici PSK Istanbul 9:0
 İstanbul Paten Spor Kulübü - Polis Akademisi ve Koleji 5:6

3rd place 
 İstanbul Paten Spor Kulübü - Bogazici PSK Istanbul 8:5

Final
 Büyükşehir Belediyesi Ankara Spor Kulübü - Polis Akademisi ve Koleji 3:4

External links
 Season on hockeyarchives.info

TBHSL
Turkish Ice Hockey Super League seasons
TBSHL